Joseph Caleb Deschanel,  (born September 21, 1944) is an American cinematographer and director of film and television. He has been nominated for the Academy Award for Best Cinematography six times. He is a member of the National Film Preservation Board of the Library of Congress, representing the American Society of Cinematographers. He has been married to actress Mary Jo Deschanel since 1972, with whom he has two daughters, actresses Emily and Zooey Deschanel.

Early life and professional education
Deschanel was born in Philadelphia, Pennsylvania, the son of Ann Ward (née Orr) and Paul Jules Deschanel. His father was French, from Oullins, Rhône, and his mother was American. Deschanel was raised in his mother's Quaker religion.

He enrolled in Severn School for his high school. He attended Johns Hopkins University from 1962 to 1966, where he met Walter Murch, with whom he staged "happenings," including one in which Murch simply sat down and ate an apple for an audience. Murch graduated a year ahead of him and encouraged Deschanel to follow him to the University of Southern California School of Cinematic Arts, where he graduated in 1968. During this time, Deschanel was a member of a band of film students called "The Dirty Dozen;" this group attracted attention from the Hollywood system. Following his graduation, he attended the American Film Institute (AFI) Conservatory and graduated in 1969 as a member of its first class.

Personal life
Deschanel joined the American Society of Cinematographers (A.S.C.) in 1969, the year of his graduation from the AFI Conservatory. In 1972, three years later, he married actress Mary Jo Weir. They have two daughters, actresses Emily and Zooey.

Filmography

As director 
Film
 The Escape Artist (1982)
 Crusoe (1988)

Music video
 Rhythm of My Heart (1991)

Television

As cinematographer

Additional photography credits

Awards and nominations

Academy Awards

BAFTA Awards

American Society of Cinematographers

National Society of Film Critics

Satellite Awards

References

External links

1944 births
American cinematographers
American film directors
American people of French descent
American Quakers
American television directors
Johns Hopkins University alumni
Living people
Photographers from Philadelphia
USC School of Cinematic Arts alumni